Porsuk is a village in the central (Sivas) district of Sivas Province, Turkey.

References

Villages in Sivas District